Joseph Stecher is an American attorney who served as the United States Attorney for the District of Nebraska from 2007 to 2009.

Early life and education

He received his bachelor's degree from Wayne State College and his J.D. from the University of Nebraska College of Law in 1983.

Career
Stecher served as deputy county attorney and then as chief deputy county attorney. From 1999 to 2002 he was the Dodge County attorney.

Stecher also served as director of the Nebraska County Attorney's Association from 1996 to 2002.

References

District attorneys in Nebraska
Living people
Nebraska Republicans
United States Attorneys for the District of Nebraska
University of Nebraska alumni
People from Omaha, Nebraska
Year of birth missing (living people)